Saginaw Metal Casting Operations  is an automobile engine foundry plant in Saginaw, Michigan. Opened under GM management in 1919, the factory produces engine blocks and cylinder heads for General Motors vehicles. The factory currently occupies 1.9 million square feet on 490 acres.  Historically in September 1927 it was known as the Chevrolet Grey Iron Foundry. In the past when it was called GM-Saginaw Product Company (SPC) a cloverleaf casting symbol mark was cast onto the iron component.

The location has been the primary source of engine block and cylinder heads for all of GM's engines, to include Oldsmobile, Pontiac, Cadillac, Chevrolet, Buick and GMC for most of the 20th century. The address is 1629 N Washington Ave. Saginaw, MI 48601, and is located on the Saginaw River. Camshafts, connecting rods and other internal engine components are manufactured at Bay City Powertrain. Casting operations were also provided by Massena Castings Plant and Defiance Foundry.

Products
Currently the location provided Aluminum engine blocks and cylinder heads which then are assembled at Tonawanda Engine, Romulus Engine, Flint Engine South, St. Catharines Engine Plant and other engine assembly factories for the items listed below.

 3.6L HFV6 blocks and heads
Also makes front 4wd axle assembly castings for Chevrolet Silverado 1500 and GMC Sierra 1500.

Previously:

2.2L/2.4L L850 engine I4 blocks 
5.3L/6.0L Gen IV V-8 blocks and heads
5.3L/6.2L Gen IV V-8 block pre-machine

See also
 List of GM factories
 List of GM engines

V8
 Chevrolet big-block engine
 Chevrolet Small-Block engine
 Buick V8 engine
 Cadillac V8 engine
 GMC V8 engine
 Oldsmobile V8 engine
 Pontiac V8 engine

V6
 Buick V6 engine

Straight Eight
 Buick Straight-8 engine
 Oldsmobile Straight-8 engine
 Pontiac straight-8 engine

Straight Six
 Chevrolet Stovebolt engine
 Chevrolet Turbo-Thrift engine
 Buick Straight-6 engine
 Oldsmobile straight-6 engine
 Pontiac straight-6 engine

References

External links
 Saginaw Metal Castings

General Motors factories
Motor vehicle assembly plants in Michigan
Buildings and structures in Saginaw County, Michigan